Claverhouse is a residential area located on the northern outskirts of Dundee, Scotland with the city centre located 2 miles (3.2 km) from the area.

Overview
Claverhouse is primarily an affluent residential area and is one of the wealthier areas in Dundee alongside Broughty Ferry and the West End of Dundee. The area is surrounded by natural parkland, reservoirs and a burn and is a popular area for golf and equestrianism. High end housing communities which feature houses and villas are located within the area.

The Dighty Burn runs past Claverhouse from the west underneath a bridge and continues to flow to the east. Located near to Claverhouse is Mains Castle and Caird Park as well as the A90 road northbound to Aberdeen through Forfar Road.

Up north from the area is the nearby Barns of Claverhouse, where local farmhouses and animals are located. It is accessible from Barns of Claverhouse Road and through the pathway into and past the Emmock Woods housing community.

History
John Graham of Claverhouse (1648–1689), known to history as "Bonnie Dundee" or "Bluidy Clavers" by his supporters and detractors respectively, was the laird of Claverhouse. The Graham family, including John Graham, owned the area of Claverhouse in the 1600s. References to John Graham and his viscountcy were used for street names as part of the Claverhouse Braes community.

The Claverhouse Bleachworks factory opened in the late 1770s and closed in the 1970s. Claverhouse Bleachfield had a chimney and a counting house which housed a bell and a clock tower. The bell has been removed although the clock tower and the chimney of the bleachwork factory still stand in Claverhouse.

The nearby Trottick Ponds were used for the Claverhouse Bleachworks factory as a power source.

Private residential communities such as Claverhouse Braes, Claver Mill, Emmock Woods and Dalclaverhouse were constructed in Claverhouse from the late 1990s to the early 2020s.

Governance
Claverhouse is in the North East ward of Dundee City Council, it is represented by Steven Rome and Willie Sawers of the Scottish National Party and Jax Finnegan of the Scottish Labour Party. The area is part of Dundee City West which is represented by Joe FitzPatrick in the Scottish Parliament, and in Dundee East which is represented by Stewart Hosie in the UK Parliament.

Education

Claverhouse is the location of one primary school, Mill of Mains Primary School, which opened in October 1972 and three nurseries, one being part of the primary school. 

The nearest secondary school is St. Paul's R.C. Academy which is only a few minutes from the area, however Baldragon Academy is also located nearby and serves as a catchment school for Mill of Mains Primary School.

Transport

Public transport in the area is quite limited compared to other areas in the Dundee due to it being quite remote and small. Buses, however, do come to the area with links to the city centre via the 10, 18 and 236 and direct routes to Kirriemuir and Forfar via the 21D. The 14S and 17S routes, which are school bus routes for pupils at St. Paul's R.C. Academy, the closest school to the area, stop at Claverhouse.

Gallery

References 

Areas of Dundee